A homegoing (or home-going) service is an African-American and Black-Canadian Christian funeral tradition marking the going home of the deceased to the Lord or to Heaven. It is a celebration that has become a vibrant part of African American and Black Canadian history and culture. As with other traditions, practices, customs and norms of African American and Black Canadian culture, this ritual for dealing with death was shaped by the African American and Black Canadian experience.

History
The history of the homegoing service can be traced back to the arrival of African slaves in America. Early during the slave trade, slaves believed death meant their soul would return home to their native Africa. This belief that enslaved and free Africans in America fly back to Africa after their death was found in the Gullah Geechee Nation. In 1803, a slave ship landed in St. Simons Island, Georgia with captive Africans from Nigeria carrying a cargo of Igbo people. The Igbo people took control of the slave vessel, and when it landed in Georgia many of the Igbos chose suicide than a life time in slavery by drowning in the swamp. African Americans in Georgia and in the Gullah Geechee Nation say that when the Igbo people died from suicide their souls flew back to Africa. The location became known as Igbo landing. Also in the Gullah Geechee Nation the practice of placing seashells on graves is believed to return souls back to Africa, as the sea brought Africans to America on slave ships and the sea will return them back home in Africa when they die. Enslaved and free blacks were not allowed to congregate to perform any kind of ritual for burying their dead because slaveholders feared the slaves would conspire to create an uprising during any such gathering. 

The Old Testament stories of God and Moses freeing a captive and enslaved race resonated with the slaves. The New Testament stories of Jesus and promises of glory in heaven and a far better after-life allowed slaves to forge through the turmoil of mortal life and look forward to the day when they would return home to the Lord. They fully embraced Christianity and death, for slaves, was viewed as freedom. Their death rituals were jubilant and it became one of the earliest forms of African American culture.

At the beginning of the twentieth century there were few, if any black-owned or black-managed funeral homes. Survivors of deceased blacks were forced to depend on white funeral homes for embalming if they would even agree to service them. Jim Crow laws and white bias required blacks to enter these white funeral homes through back doors and basements, a degrading experience that added to the tragedy of losing a loved one.

Although the embalming was mostly done by white funeral homes, the homegoing service took place in the black Christian church. The churches began forming burial societies to collect money for funerals. Black businessmen who opened funeral homes during the early-to-mid-twentieth century saw not only a business opportunity, but a way to help the community. Funeral parlors were among some of the first black-owned businesses and the black funeral director was a trusted friend and neighbor in the community. The tradition of the black community funeral director and the support of the black Christian church exists in many black communities today, though the rise of funeral parlor chains poses a threat to the uniqueness of homegoing traditions in the early twenty-first century.

Homegoing services
The funeral portion of a homegoing service follows many of the same practices as any other Christian funeral service. There are pall bearers and flowers and the service is typically held in a church. Because African-American Christians believe death marks the return to the Lord and an end to the pain and suffering of mortal life, the homegoing service is an occasion marked by rejoicing because the deceased is going on to a better place.

A homegoing service usually contains some or all of these elements:

 Musical prelude
 Processional
 Prayers
 Songs (hymns of comfort)
 Funeral readings (scripture - Old Testament and New Testament, poetry, prayer) and acknowledgements
 Reading of cards and condolences
 Reading of funeral resolutions
 Obituary reading
 Eulogy or tribute
 Final viewing
 Benediction
 Recessional, and interment or committal

A homegoing service is sometimes reminiscent of an African-American and Black Canadian Christian church services, in which it is rooted. In addition to the eulogy, there is often a sermon and a choir that sings gospel hymns. The service often allows for friends and family to speak briefly about their remembrances of the deceased. Homegoing Service goers may experience both mourning and rejoicing.

Each service is specialized to the needs and interest of survivors, and in recent years, the variety of funerary themes may be increasing.

In popular culture
In 2013, Homegoings, a documentary directed by Christine Turner, was released as part of PBS' series POV.

References

 Holloway, Karla. (2003). Passed On: African American Mourning,  3 - 19.  USA: Duke University Press.
 The History of African American Funeral Service.  (n.d.). Retrieved from Woods-Valentine Mortuary.
 Homegoing Services and the Black Community!.  (n.d.). Retrieved from The Old Black Church Blog.
 Marsden, Sara J., Homegoing Funerals: An African American Funeral Tradition. (n.d.). Retrieved from U.S. Funerals.

Further reading
 
 
 https://www.talkdeath.com/7-elements-of-african-american-mourning-practices-burial-traditions/

External links 

http://theoldblackchurch.blogspot.com/2010/09/home-going-services-and-black-community.html
http://www.us-funerals.com/funeral-articles/homegoing-funerals.html#.U_i2bvmwJcR
https://www.dukeupress.edu/Passed-On/

African-American culture
Funerals in the United States
Black Canadian culture
Funerals in Canada
African-American Christianity